Steve Mormando (born August 14, 1955) is an American fencer. He competed in the individual and team sabre events at the 1984, 1988 and 1992 Summer Olympics. He was the national champion in the sabre in 1987. He is also a successful fencing coach, a career which started in 1981.

Biography
Mormando was born in 1955 in Toms River, New Jersey, fencing with the Fencers Club in New York. He was raised on a farm by his grandparents, working there six days a week. He studied at Rutgers University, where he graduated in 1980. The following year, he took a coaching role at New York University. In 1987, he was the head coach for the men's team at the university, and two years later, he was also the head coach of the women's team.

At the Pan American Games, Mormando won a total of four medals. These included three silvers in the team sabre event from 1983 to 1991, and an individual gold at the 1991 Pan American Games. He also competed at four editions of the World Fencing Championships between 1985 and 1991.

Mormando competed at three successive Olympic Games; the 1984 Summer Olympics in Los Angeles, the 1988 Summer Olympics in Seoul and the 1992 Summer Olympics in Barcelona. His best finish was sixth place in the team sabre event at the 1984 Olympics, and his best individual performance was 12th in the sabre event also at the 1984 Olympics.

At the masters level, Mormando won a bronze medal at the Veterans Over-50 World Championships in Florida in 2005, and a gold medal at the 1998 Nike World Masters' Games in Oregon.

As a coach, Mormando has coached more than forty All-Americans as well as six NCAA Champions. He has been inducted into several halls of fame, including the Rutgers University and the New Jersey Shore. He was also inducted into the USA Fencing Hall of Fame in 2020.

References

External links
 

1955 births
Living people
American male sabre fencers
Olympic fencers of the United States
Fencers at the 1984 Summer Olympics
Fencers at the 1988 Summer Olympics
Fencers at the 1992 Summer Olympics
Sportspeople from Toms River, New Jersey
Pan American Games medalists in fencing
Pan American Games gold medalists for the United States
Pan American Games silver medalists for the United States
Fencers at the 1991 Pan American Games
Medalists at the 1991 Pan American Games